George Bernard Kauffman (September 4, 1930 – May 2, 2020) was an American chemist.

Life
Kauffman was born in Philadelphia, the son of Laura (Fisher) and Joseph Philip Kauffman. He received his bachelor's degree from the University of Pennsylvania, and Ph.D. from the University of Florida. Kauffman was a Professor of Chemistry at California State University, Fresno. He wrote over 17 books and over 2,000 articles.

In 1978, George B. Kauffman received the Dexter Award for Outstanding Achievement in the History of Chemistry from the American Chemical Society. He was a Guggenheim Fellow.

Kauffman died on May 2, 2020, at his home in Fresno, California at the age of 89.

References

1930 births
2020 deaths
University of Florida alumni
University of Pennsylvania alumni
California State University, Fresno faculty
Historians of science